{{Speciesbox
| taxon = Profundiconus lani
| image =Conus lani 1.jpg
| image_caption =Apertural and abapertural views of shell of Profundiconus lani (Crandall, 1979)
| authority = (Crandall, 1979)
| synonyms_ref =
| synonyms =
 Conus (Profundiconus) nigrostriatus Kosuge, 1979 · accepted, alternate representation
 Conus lani Crandall, 1979 (original combination)
 Conus nigrostriatus Kosuge, 1979
| display_parents = 3
}}Profundiconus lani''' is a species of sea snail, a marine gastropod mollusk in the family Conidae, the cone snails and their allies. Puillandre N., Duda T.F., Meyer C., Olivera B.M. & Bouchet P. (2015). One, four or 100 genera? A new classification of the cone snails. Journal of Molluscan Studies. 81: 1–23

Like all species within the genus Profundiconus, these cone snails are predatory and venomous. They are capable of "stinging" humans, therefore live ones should be handled carefully or not at all.

Description
The size of the shell varies between 41 mm and 54 mm.

Distribution
This marine species occurs off Taiwan, the Philippines, the Solomon Islands, the Loyalty Islands and New Caledonia; in the South China Sea.

References

 Tucker J.K. & Tenorio M.J. (2009) Systematic classification of Recent and fossil conoidean gastropods.'' Hackenheim: Conchbooks. 296 pp.

External links
 The Conus Biodiversity website
Cone Shells – Knights of the Sea

lani
Gastropods described in 1979